Muddy Pass may refer to:

 Muddy Pass (Continental Divide), a mountain pass on the Continental Divide of the Americas in the Park Range of Colorado
 Muddy Pass (Eagle County, Colorado), a mountain pass in Eagle County, Colorado

See also